Helias is a genus of skippers in the family Hesperiidae.

Species
Recognised species in the genus Helias include:
 Helias phalaenoides (Herrich Schäffer, 1863)

Former species
 Helias ascalaphus Staudinger, 1876 - transferred to Staphylus ascalaphus (Staudinger, 1876)
 Helias pallida Felder, 1869 - transferred to Eantis pallida (Felder, 1869)
 Helias satyrus C. and R. Felder, [1867] - transferred to Timochreon satyrus (C. and R. Felder, [1867])

References

Natural History Museum Lepidoptera genus database

Erynnini
Hesperiidae genera
Taxa named by Johan Christian Fabricius